The Empress Wu Tse-Tien is a 1939 Chinese historical film based on the life of Wu Zetian, the only female emperor in Chinese history. Directed by Fang Peilin, the film starred Gu Lanjun as the titular character.

Cast 
 Gu Lanjun
 Yin Xiucen
 Huang Naishuang
 Li Ming
 Liang Xin
 Bai Hong

External links 

1939 films
1939 drama films
1930s Mandarin-language films
Chinese black-and-white films
Films set in 7th-century Tang dynasty
Films set in 8th-century Tang dynasty
Works about Wu Zetian
Cultural depictions of Wu Zetian
Chinese drama films